The Department of Climate Change, Energy, the Environment and Water (DCCEEW) is a department of the Australian Government. The department was established on 1 July 2022, superseding the water and environment functions from the Department of Agriculture, Water and the Environment and energy functions from the Department of Industry, Science, Energy and Resources.

The current and inaugural head of the department is the Secretary, David Fredericks.

References

2022 establishments in Australia
Australia, Climate Change, Energy, the Environment and Water
Climate Change, Energy, the Environment and Water